Carl Winckow known in Spain, where he spent most of his working life, as Carlos Winkow (6 February 1882 – 16 January 1952) was a German type designer who worked primarily for the Nacional Typefoundry.

Fonts Designed by Carlos Winkow 
 Elzeviriano Ibarra (1931, Gans Typefoundry), digitized in 2011 by Lucia Walter.
 Reporter, (1938, L. Wagner Type Foundry), reissued as Cursiva Rusinol by Nacional
 Electra, (c. 1940, Nacional), digitized by Font Bureau as Romeo.
 Nacional, (1941, Nacional)
 Iberica, (1942, Nacional), digitized in 1997 by Pat Hickson as Roller.
 Alcazar, (1944, Nacional)
 Gong, (1945, L. Wagner Type Foundry)

References

Notes
Jaspert, W. Pincus, W. Turner Berry and A.F. Johnson. The Encyclopedia of Type Faces. Blandford Press Lts.: 1953, 1983. .
Font Designer - Carlos Winkow
MyFonts – Carlos Winkow

1882 births
1952 deaths
German graphic designers
German typographers and type designers
German expatriates in Spain